George Fitzwilliam (28 February 1756 – 6 May 1786) was a British Member of Parliament.

Biography
Fitzwilliam was the younger son of William Fitzwilliam, 3rd Earl Fitzwilliam, by his wife Anne, sister of Charles Watson-Wentworth, 2nd Marquess of Rockingham. He was educated at Eton and Trinity Hall, Cambridge and served in the 1st Troop, Horse Grenadier Guards. His brother William Fitzwilliam, 4th Earl Fitzwilliam suggested him as a candidate for Grimsby at the general election in 1780, but his uncle Rockingham refused to contribute to the costs. Instead he replaced Sir Lawrence Dundas in a by-election at Richmond (Fitzwilliam's sister Charlotte was married to Dundas's son Thomas). In the House of Commons he voted against parliamentary reform in May 1783, and as a result his brother Lord Fitzwilliam was dissuaded from nominating him for York at a by-election later that year and at the general election in 1784, when he left the House. There is no record of his having spoken in Parliament. He died, unmarried, two years later.

Notes

References

1757 births
1786 deaths
Younger sons of earls
People educated at Eton College
Alumni of Trinity Hall, Cambridge
British MPs 1780–1784
Members of the Parliament of Great Britain for English constituencies